Čegar is a location in Serbia where the Battle of Čegar Hill took place. It was first marked on July 4, 1878 with the following inscription: 
"To voivoda Stevan Sinđelić and his undying heroes who lost their lives on May 19, 1809, in their attack on Niš. Knez Milan M. Obrenović IV and his brave soldiers redeemed them on December 27, 1877 by conquering Niš."

Today's monument in the shape of a tower - a symbol of the soldiers' fortification - was erected for the fiftieth anniversary of the liberation of Niš from the Turks, on June 1, 1927. In 1938 a bronze bust of Stevan Sinđelić was positioned in the semicircular niche of the monument.

Gallery

See also
 First Serbian Uprising
 Skull Tower
 Tourism in Serbia
 Historic Landmarks of Exceptional Importance

External links
 Niš official website

Hills of Serbia
Monuments and memorials in Serbia
Serbian inscriptions
Historic Landmarks of Exceptional Importance